The 2018 European Badminton Championships were the 27th tournament of the European Badminton Championships. They were held in Huelva, Spain, from 24–29 April 2018.

Tournament
The 2018 European Badminton Championships is the 27th edition of the championships. This tournament was awarded to Carolina Marín's hometown Huelva following a decision adopted by the Executive Committee of Badminton Europe and made public at the General Assembly of the aforementioned organization that took place in Prague, Czech Republic. The candidature led by the Spanish Badminton Federation in collaboration with the city of Huelva, the Regional Government of Andalusia, the Deputation of Huelva and the Andalusian Badminton Federation will organize the European Championships to be played between 24 and 29 April 2018.

The tournament consist of men's (singles and doubles), women's (singles and doubles), and also mixed doubles. 300 athletes from 25 countries will compete in this tournament.

Venue
The tournament will be held at the Palacio de Deportes de Huelva, Spain, also known as Carolina Marín Sports Hall – a facility dedicated to the Spanish badminton player who has managed to find her place on a podium usually taken by Asians. The Principe de Asturias Sports Hall in University of Huelva will be used as training section.

Point distribution
Below is the tables with the point distribution for each phase of the tournament based on the BWF points system for the European Badminton Championships.

Medal summary

Medalists

Medal table

Men's singles

Seeds

  Viktor Axelsen (champion)
  Anders Antonsen (quarterfinals)
  Rajiv Ouseph (final)
  Brice Leverdez (semifinals)
  Rasmus Gemke (quarterfinals)
  Mark Caljouw (third round)
  Pablo Abián (second round)
  Lucas Corvée (quarterfinals)

Wild card
Badminton Europe (BEC) awarded a wild card entry to Jan Ø. Jørgensen of Denmark.

Finals

Top half

Section 1

Section 2

Bottom half

Section 3

Section 4

Women's singles

Seeds

  Carolina Marín (champion)
  Kirsty Gilmour (quarterfinals)
  Mia Blichfeldt (semifinals)
  Evgeniya Kosetskaya (final)
  Beatriz Corrales (second round)
  Line Kjærsfeldt (semifinals)
  Natalia Koch Rohde (quarterfinals)
  Neslihan Yiğit (third round)

Wild card
Badminton Europe (BEC) awarded a wild card entry to Sara Peñalver Pereira of Spain.

Finals

Top half

Section 1

Section 2

Bottom half

Section 3

Section 4

Men's doubles

Seeds

  Mathias Boe / Carsten Mogensen (withdrew)
  Mads Conrad-Petersen / Mads Pieler Kolding (final)
  Kim Astrup / Anders Skaarup Rasmussen (champions)
  Vladimir Ivanov / Ivan Sozonov (semifinals)
  Marcus Ellis / Chris Langridge (quarterfinals)
  David Daugaard / Mathias Christiansen (quarterfinals)
  Jones Ralfy Jansen / Josche Zurwonne (quarterfinals)
  Mark Lamsfuß / Marvin Emil Seidel (quarterfinals)

Finals

Top half

Section 1

Section 2

Bottom half

Section 3

Section 4

Women's doubles

Seeds

  Kamilla Rytter Juhl / Christinna Pedersen (withdrew)
  Gabriela Stoeva / Stefani Stoeva (champions)
  Maiken Fruergaard / Sara Thygesen (semifinals)
  Lauren Smith / Sarah Walker (quarterfinals)
  Selena Piek / Cheryl Seinen (semifinals)
  Émilie Lefel / Anne Tran (final)
  Isabel Herttrich / Carla Nelte (first round)
  Chloe Birch / Jessica Pugh (quarterfinals)

Wild card
Badminton Europe (BEC) awarded a wild card entry to Olga Konon and Linda Efler of Germany.

Finals

Top half

Section 1

Section 2

Bottom half

Section 3

Section 4

Mixed doubles

Seeds

  Chris Adcock / Gabrielle Adcock (champions)
  Mathias Christiansen / Christinna Pedersen (final)
  Marcus Ellis / Lauren Smith (semifinals)
  Jacco Arends / Selena Piek (quarterfinals)
  Mark Lamsfuß / Isabel Herttrich (semifinals)
  Evgenij Dremin / Evgenia Dimova (quarterfinals)
  Marvin Emil Seidel / Linda Efler (quarterfinals)
  Ronan Labar / Audrey Fontaine (quarterfinals)

Wild card
Badminton Europe (BEC) awarded a wild card entry to Joachim Fischer Nielsen and Alexandra Bøje of Denmark.

Finals

Top half

Section 1

Section 2

Bottom half

Section 3

Section 4

References

External links
Official website
Tournament link

2018
2018 in badminton
Badminton Championships
International sports competitions hosted by Spain
2018 in Spanish sport
Badminton tournaments in Spain
Sport in Huelva
April 2018 sports events in Spain